Julius Kalle Joelsson (born 21 March 1998) is a Swedish footballer who plays as a goalkeeper for Helsingborgs IF.

References

1998 births
Living people
Swedish footballers
Association football goalkeepers
Helsingborgs IF players
Allsvenskan players
Ängelholms FF players